Wrong Lake Airport  is located next to Wrong Lake, Manitoba, Canada.

References

Registered aerodromes in Manitoba